Sophie Joissains (born 25 October 1969) is a French politician and a member of the Senate of France. She represents the Bouches-du-Rhône department and is a member of the Radical Party.

Early life
Sophie Joissains was born on 25 October 1969 to Alain Joissains, mayor of Aix-en-Provence from 1978 to 1983, and Maryse Joissains-Masini, also mayor since 2001. To study the Law, she moved to Paris, then Louvain, and she eventually received a Master of Advanced Studies. She also worked in cinema for Anatole Dauman, and started a career as a criminologist.

Career
In 2008, she became the youngest female member of the French Senate. She served as the deputy mayor of Aix-en-Provence between 2020 and 2021 and was subsequently elected mayor on 24 September 2021.  She has been accused of nepotism.

She supports the HADOPI law. Alongside Claude Domeizel, she has proposed a bank holiday to celebrate laïcité.

Personal life
She is a cancer survivor.

References

External links
Official blog

1969 births
Living people
People from Aix-en-Provence
Politicians from Provence-Alpes-Côte d'Azur
Radical Party (France) politicians
Union of Democrats and Independents politicians
Radical Movement politicians
French Senators of the Fifth Republic
Senators of Bouches-du-Rhône
French criminologists
20th-century French lawyers
21st-century French lawyers
20th-century French women lawyers
21st-century French women lawyers
Women members of the Senate (France)
21st-century French women politicians
French women criminologists
Aix-Marseille University alumni